Azerbaijani Canadians are Canadian citizens and permanent residents of ethnic Azerbaijani background, or those who were born in Azerbaijan. Most Azerbaijani-Canadians have immigrated to Canada from the Republic of Azerbaijan, Iran, Russia or Turkey.

Demographics
According to the Canada 2021 Census, 9,915 Canadians claimed ethnic Azerbaijani background, with nearly half living in Ontario. The 2021 census results also mapped the following distribution of Azerbaijani Canadians by province:

History
As of 2016, there were 1,260 Canadians of Azerbaijani origin who were second-generation immigrants and only 40 who were third-generation or more.

Though immigration from Azerbaijan dates earlier than 1980, ethnic Azerbaijanis were first mentioned in the official census results in 2001. Since then, their numbers have gradually grown, with immigration peaking in 2001–2005.

Notable Azerbaijani Canadians
 Piruz Dilanchi Politician, Poet, Writer, Public Figure
 Reza Baraheni – prominent scholar and human rights activist
 Ismayil Hajiyev – musician, composer and conductor
 Reza Moridi – Member of the Ontario Provincial Parliament
Feridun Hamdullahpur - sixth president and vice-chancellor (2010-2021) of the University of Waterloo
Ilham Akhundov - mathematician, University of Waterloo.
Adil Babirov - pianist and composer.

Organizations 
There are a number of active cultural and political advocacy Azerbaijani organizations established in Canada.
Network of Azerbaijani Canadians (NAC) - is a primary advocacy organization active in promoting and preserving Azerbaijani culture, and representing the interests of Azerbaijani Canadians. It was founded in September 2020 and headquartered in Toronto, ON. 
 Tabriz Azerbaijani Music and Dance Ensemble - was founded in Toronto in 2003.  It originally consisted of Dance and Music groups, but recently we have added a Choir group as well.  The Music and Dance groups have in recent years expanded in number, in diversity of instruments and dances, as well as, in repertoire. 
Azerbaijan Cultural Society of Edmonton (AzCSE) - is a cultural society established in 2012. The main objective of AzCSE is to gather all Edmontonians who are interested in Azerbaijan's culture, dances, music, foods. It is based in Edmonton, AB.
Alberta Azerbaijani Cultural Society (ALACS) - was established in 2005 to promote and advocate for Azerbaijani history, language and culture, and is based in Calgary, AB.
Karabakh - Azerbaijani Language School in Ottawa - was established in 2011.
Azerbaijani Women's Support Center (AWSC) - was founded in 2005 to support and empower newcomer and immigrant women from diverse backgrounds. The organization is based in Toronto, ON and is a registered charity.
Azerbaijani Canadian Youth Network (ACYN) - was founded on September 29, 2021 and supports Azerbaijani Canadian youth and students. Our network focuses on guiding Azerbaijani youth to higher positions in society and helping them gain volunteering experience and internship positions. Their mission is to help Azerbaijani Canadian students with their academic and language needs and skills in order for them to be successful in the future.
Alov Foundation - founded in 2019 to support charity initiatives of the Azerbaijani community in Canada.

See also 
Azerbaijan–Canada relations
West Asian Canadians
Middle Eastern Canadians
Azerbaijani diaspora
Ethnic origins of people in Canada

References

Ethnic groups in Canada
 
Asian Canadian
Azerbaijani diaspora
 
West Asian Canadians